Footsie may refer to:
"Footsee", a seminal dance-track from the mid-1970s UK Northern soul scene
 Footsie, a playful form of flirting with feet
 Foot selfie, a photograph taken of one's own feet
 FTSE 100, the UK share index, informally known as the "Footsie"
Footsie, a grime MC and record producer, one half of the East London duo Newham Generals